Orizabus pinalicus is a species of rhinoceros beetle in the family Scarabaeidae. It is found in North America.

References

Further reading

External links

 

Dynastinae
Beetles described in 2011